Ahkeem Shavon Rose (born 27 November 1998) is a Jamaican professional footballer who plays as a winger or a striker for National League side Weymouth.

Rose notably played as a professional in the EFL for Grimsby Town where he scored 3 goals in 34 appearances. Prior to joining The Mariners he had played Non-League football for both Pelsall Villa and Heather St John's before initially signing for Grimsby's academy setup. In 2018 he had a spell on loan with Boston United and later joined Dover Athletic upon his release from Blundell Park.

Career
Rose was born in Jamaica. He attended Sandwell College as a sports student in West Bromwich. Aged 16, Rose scored a hat-trick on his debut for Midland Football League Division One club Pelsall Villa in November 2015.

Grimsby Town
In December 2016, Rose had a two week trial at EFL League Two club Grimsby Town. He signed an 18-month contract on 20 December 2016. Rose signed a new two-year contract on 26 June 2018. He made his first-team debut on 14 August 2018 coming on as a substitute in the 83rd minute against Rochdale in the EFL Cup.

On 6 September 2018, Rose joined Boston United on an initial one-month loan. He made three appearances and scored two goals for Boston, before returning to Grimsby on 6 October 2018.

Rose made his League Two debut on 6 October 2018, coming on in the 77th minute as a substitute in a 2–0 home win against Port Vale. He scored his first professional league goal on 17 November 2018, after coming off the substitutes bench in the 80th minute. With 4 minutes to go he rifled the ball into the top left corner, securing a 1–0 win for his team against Crawley Town.

Dover Athletic
On 7 September 2020, Rose signed for National League club Dover Athletic. Rose made his debut for the club on the opening day of the campaign, replacing Ade Azeez in the 73 minute of a 1-0 victory over Notts County. He scored his first goal on 16 January 2021, getting the equaliser in an eventual 3–1 defeat to Wrexham. Following's Dover's decision to not play any more matches in the 2020–21 season, made in late January, and subsequent null and voiding of all results, on 5 May 2021 it was announced that Rose was out of contract and had left the club.

Weymouth
On 13 July 2021, Rose joined National League side Weymouth. On 1 December 2021, he was sent out on a one-month loan deal to Southern Football League Premier Division South side Wimborne Town.

Career statistics

References

External links
Ahkeem Rose profile at the Grimsby Town F.C. website

1998 births
Living people
Jamaican emigrants to the United Kingdom
Jamaican expatriate sportspeople in England
Jamaican footballers
Jamaican expatriate footballers
Expatriate footballers in England
Association football forwards
Pelsall Villa F.C. players
Heather St John's F.C. players
Grimsby Town F.C. players
Boston United F.C. players
Dover Athletic F.C. players
Weymouth F.C. players
Wimborne Town F.C. players
Midland Football League players
English Football League players
National League (English football) players
Southern Football League players